The Indian Institute of Technology, Kharagpur has had numerous notable alumni.

Academics

Science and engineering

Politics and Administration

Business

Arts and Entertainment

Activists

Sports

References

Indian Institutes of Technology alumni
Indian Institute of Technology, Kharagpur alumni
Indian Institutes of Technology people